Phosphoglucomutase-like protein 5 is an enzyme that in humans is encoded by the PGM5 gene.

References

Further reading